The Lachman Crags form an escarpment which extends in a north–south direction for about , its high point rising to , standing  south-southwest of Cape Lachman on James Ross Island, Antarctica. Berry Hill lies between the crags and the cape. It was surveyed by the Falkland Islands Dependencies Survey in 1945, and named after Cape Lachman.

References

Escarpments of Antarctica
Landforms of Graham Land
Landforms of James Ross Island